The Cannone-Mitragliera da 37/54 (Breda) was a  automatic anti-aircraft gun produced by the Breda company in Italy.

It was used by both the Regia Marina and the Regio Esercito during World War II, with the former using it as the standard light anti-aircraft weapon on its battleships and cruisers. Nazi Germany used captured weapons after the surrender of Italy in 1943 as the 3.7 cm Breda (i).

Design
The Model 1932 was water-cooled while Models 1938 and 1939 were air-cooled. The gun was fed by a flat magazine holding six rounds which could be loaded one after another to maintain a high rate of fire. It was possible to select alternate rates of fire, either 60, 90 or 120 rpm. The twin mountings for Models 1932 and 1938 were very heavy and required a strong supporting structure. The single Model 1939 (fitted on the Andrea Doria-class and Littorio-class battleships), was instead a single collapsible mount, which also had much less vibrations than its predecessors thanks to the addition of an equilibrator. This meant it could also fitted on smaller warships.

Ship classes that carried the Breda 37/54 include:

 

The Breda 37/54 was also fitted in the CANSA FC.20bis ground attack aircraft prototype in its variant Model 39 37/45.

Performance
Although appreciated in the Regia Marina, overall this gun was of limited efficacy because of its gas-operated action (which reduced its rate of fire) and its substantial vibrations (due to their non-recoiling mounting) which impaired accuracy. Instead the single collapsible model, which largely eliminated the latter issue, was seen as a definite improvement, while still being rather heavy and with its production being insufficient to satisfy the needs.

Comparison of anti-aircraft guns

References

Bibliography
Bagnasco, Erminio. Le armi delle navi italiane nella Seconda Guerra Mondiale. Parma, Albertelli, 1978 (2007 ed.) 

 Gander, Terry and Chamberlain, Peter. Weapons of the Third Reich: An Encyclopedic Survey of All Small Arms, Artillery and Special Weapons of the German Land Forces 1939-1945. New York: Doubleday, 1979 

World War II weapons of Italy
World War II anti-aircraft guns
World War II artillery of Italy
37 mm artillery
Breda weapons
Military equipment introduced in the 1930s